

Draw

First round

Semifinals

Gold medal match

Women's Team